Naiktha Bains and Francesca Di Lorenzo were the defending champions, but both players chose not to participate.

Martina Di Giuseppe and Giulia Gatto-Monticone won the title, defeating Anna Kalinskaya and Sofya Lansere in the final, 6–1, 6–1.

Seeds

Draw

Draw

References
Main Draw

Engie Open Saint-Gaudens Occitanie - Doubles